That Hamilton Man is an album by drummer and bandleader Chico Hamilton, recorded in 1959 and released on the SESAC label. The album was a limited release "electronic transcription" to promote SESAC-controlled material to radio stations.

Reception

AllMusic rated the album three stars.

Track listing
 "Fat Mouth" (Dick Vance) - 3:01
 "Theme for a Starlet" (Hal Keller) - 2:46
 "Little Lost Bear" (Krevit) - 1:48
 "Champs-Elysees" (Gerald Wiggins) - 2:32
 "Pretty Little Theme" (Chico Hamilton) - 1:51
 "Lost in the Night" (Richard Maltby) - 3:18
 "Frou Frou" (Victor Young) - 3:19
 "Cawn Pawn" (Hale Smith) - 2:31
 "Lullaby for Dreamers" (Vance) - 2:59
 "Opening" (Hamilton) - 1:39
 "Lady "E"" (Eric Dolphy) - 2:40
 "Truth" (Drucker) - 3:08

Personnel
Chico Hamilton - drums
Eric Dolphy - alto saxophone, bass clarinet, flute
Nathan Gershman - cello
Dennis Budimir - guitar
Ralph Pena (tracks 8 & 11), Wyatt Ruther (tracks 1–7, 9, 10 & 12) - bass

References 

Chico Hamilton albums
1959 albums